Frederick Albert Cook (June 10, 1865 – August 5, 1940) was an American explorer, physician, and ethnographer who is most known for purportedly being the first to reach the North Pole on April 21, 1908. A competing claim was made a year later by Robert Peary, though both men's accounts have since been fiercly disputed; in December 1909, after reviewing Cook's limited records, a commission of the University of Copenhagen ruled his claim unproven. Nonetheless, in 1911, Cook published a memoir of the expedition in which he maintained the veracity of his assertions. In addition, he also claimed to have been the first person to reach the summit of Denali (then known as Mount McKinley), the highest mountain in North America, a claim which has since been similarly discredited. Though he may not have achieved either Denali or the North Pole, his was the first and only expedition where a United States national discovered an Arctic island, Meighen Island.

Biography 
Cook was born in Hortonville, New York, in Sullivan County. (His birthplace is sometimes listed as Callicoon or Delaware, both also in Sullivan County.) His parents, Theodor and Magdalena Koch, were recent German immigrants who adopted an anglicized version of their surname. He attended local schools before college. After graduating from Columbia University, he studied medicine at what is today NYU's Grossman School of Medicine, receiving his doctorate in 1890. 

Cook married Libby Forbes in 1889. She died two years later. In 1902, on his 37th birthday, he married Marie Fidele Hunt. They had two daughters together.  They divorced in 1923.

Early expeditions 
Cook was the surgeon on Robert Peary's Arctic expedition of 1891–1892, and on the Belgian Antarctic Expedition of 1897–1899. He contributed to saving the lives of its crew members when their ship – the  – was ice-bound during the winter, as they had not prepared for such an event. It became the first expedition to winter in the Antarctic region. To prevent scurvy, Cook went hunting to keep the crew supplied with fresh meat.

In 1897, Cook twice visited Tierra del Fuego, where he met the English missionary Thomas Bridges. They studied the Ona and Yahgan peoples, with whom Bridges had worked for two decades. During this time, Bridges had prepared a manuscript on their language's grammar and a dictionary of more than 30,000 words. Several years later, Cook tried to publish the dictionary as his own.

Summit of Denali 

In 1903, Cook led an expedition to Denali, during which he circumnavigated the range. He made a second journey in 1906, after which he claimed to have achieved the first summit of its peak with one other expedition crew member. Other members, including Belmore Browne, whom Cook had left on the lower mountain, immediately but privately expressed doubt. Cook's claims were not publicly challenged until 1909 when the dispute with Peary over the North Pole claim erupted, with Peary's supporters claiming Cook's Denali ascent was also fraudulent.

Unlike Hudson Stuck in 1913, Cook had not taken photographs from atop Denali.

In late 1909, Ed Barrill, Cook's sole companion during the 1906 climb, signed an affidavit saying that they had not reached the summit. In the late 20th century, historians found that he had been paid by Peary supporters to deny Cook's claim. (Henderson writes that this fact was covered up at the time, but Bryce says that it was never a secret.) Up until a month before, Barrill had consistently asserted that he and Cook had reached the summit.

Climber Bradford Washburn gathered data, repeated the climbs, and took new photos to evaluate Cook's 1906 claim. Between 1956 and 1995, Washburn and Brian Okonek identified the locations of most of the photographs Cook took during his 1906 Denali foray and took new photos at the same spots. In 1997 Bryce identified the locations of the remaining photographs, including Cook's "summit" photograph; none was taken anywhere near the summit. Washburn showed that none of Cook's 1906 photos was taken past the Gateway. 

A 1910 expedition by the Mazama Club reported that Cook's map departed abruptly from the landscape at a point when the summit was still  distant. Critics of Cook's claims have compared Cook's map of his alleged 1906 route with the landscape of the last . Cook's descriptions of the summit ridge are variously claimed to bear no resemblance to the mountain and to have been verified by many subsequent climbers. In the 1970s, climber Hans Waale found a route that fitted both Cook's narrative and descriptions. Three decades later, in 2005 and 2006, this route was successfully climbed by a group of Russian mountaineers.

No evidence of Cook's purported journey between the "Gateway" and the summit has been found. His claim to have reached the summit is not supported by his photos' vistas, his two sketch maps' markers, and peak-numberings for points attained. Similarly, neither his recorded compass bearings, barometer readings, route-map, nor camp trash support his claim of reaching the summit. In contrast, evidence in all of these categories have been found short of the Gateway.

North Pole 

After the Mount Denali expedition, Cook returned to the Arctic in 1907. He planned to attempt to reach the North Pole, although he did not announce his intention until August 1907, when he was already in the Arctic. He left Annoatok, a small settlement in the north of Greenland, in February 1908. Cook claimed that he reached the pole on April 21, 1908, after traveling north from Axel Heiberg Island, taking with him only two Inuit men, Ahpellah and Etukishook. On the journey south, he claimed to have been cut off from his intended route to Annoatok by open water. Living off local game, his party was forced to push south to Jones Sound, spending the open water season and part of the winter on Devon Island. From there they traveled north, eventually crossing Nares Strait to Annoatok on the Greenland side in the spring of 1909. They said they almost died of starvation during the journey.

Cook and his two companions were gone from Annoatok for 14 months, and their whereabouts in that period is a matter of intense controversy. In the view of Canadian historian Pierre Berton (Berton, 2001), Cook's story of his trek around the Arctic islands is probably legitimate. Other writers have relied on later accounts told by Cook's companions to investigators, who seemed to present another view.

There are similarities between Ahpellah and Etukishook's sketched route of their journey south, and the route taken by the fictional shipwrecked explorers in Jules Verne's novel The Adventures of Captain Hatteras. For example, the route the two Inuit traced on a map goes over both the Pole of Cold and the wintering site of the fictional expedition. Both expeditions went to the same area of Jones Sound in hopes of finding a whaling ship to take them to civilization.

Cook's claim was initially widely believed, but it was disputed by Cook's rival polar explorer Robert Peary, who claimed to have reached the North Pole in April 1909. Cook initially congratulated Peary for his achievement, but Peary and his supporters launched a campaign to discredit Cook. They enlisted the aid of socially prominent people outside the field of science, such as football coach Fielding H. Yost (as related in Fred Russell's 1943 book, I'll Go Quietly).

Cook never produced detailed original navigational records to substantiate his claim to have reached the North Pole. He said that his detailed records were part of his belongings, contained in three boxes, which he left at Annoatok in April 1909. When Whitney tried to bring Cook's boxes with him on his return to the US on Peary's ship Roosevelt in 1909, Peary refused to allow them on board. As a result, Whitney left Cook's boxes in a cache in Greenland. They were never found.

On December 21, 1909, a commission at the University of Copenhagen, after having examined evidence submitted by Cook, ruled that his records did not contain proof that the explorer reached the Pole. (Peary refused to submit his records for review by such a third party, and for decades the National Geographic Society, which held his papers, refused researchers access to them.)

Cook intermittently claimed he had kept copies of his sextant navigational data, and in 1911 published some. These have an incorrect solar diameter. Ahwelah and Etukishook, Cook's Inuit companions, gave seemingly conflicting details about where they had gone with him. The major conflicts have been resolved in the light of improved geographical knowledge. Whitney was convinced that they had reached the North Pole with Cook, but was reluctant to be drawn into the controversy.

The Peary expedition's people (primarily Matthew Henson, who had a working knowledge of Inuit, and George Borup, who did not) claimed that Ahwelah and Etukishook told them they had traveled only a few days from land. A map allegedly was drawn by Ahwelaw and Etukishook that correctly located and accurately depicted then-unknown Meighen Island, which strongly suggests that they visited it as they claimed. Canadian Vilhjalmur Stefansson's expedition in 1916 later landed on Meighen Island; Stefansson later read Cook's papers and agreed that Meighen Island was a Cook discovery. It is known as the only island to be discovered by a United States expedition in the North American arctic. For more detail see Bryce (1997) and Henderson (2005).

The conflicting claims of Cook and Peary prompted Roald Amundsen to take extensive precautions in navigation during his South Pole expedition so there could be no doubt concerning attainment of the pole if successful. Amundsen also had the advantage of traveling over a continent. He left unmistakable evidence of his presence at the South Pole, whereas any ice on which Cook might or might not have camped would have drifted many miles in the year between the competing claims.

At the end of his 1911 memoir, Cook wrote: "I have stated my case, presented my proofs. As to the relative merits of my claim, and Mr. Peary's, place the two records side by side. Compare them. I shall be satisfied with your decision."

Reputation 
Cook's reputation never recovered from the attacks on his claim. While Peary's North Pole claim was widely accepted for most of the 20th century, it has since been discredited by a variety of reviewers, including the National Geographic Society, which long supported him. Cook spent the next few years defending his claim and threatening to sue writers who said that he had faked the trip. 

Researching the complicated story of the conflicting claims, the writer Robert Bryce began to assess how the men's personalities and goals were in contrast, and evaluated them against the period of the Gilded Age. He believes that Cook, as a physician and ethnographer, cared about the people on his expedition and admired the Inuit. Bryce writes that Cook "genuinely loved and hungered for the real meat of exploration—mapping new routes and shorelines, learning and adapting to the survival techniques of the Eskimos, advancing his own knowledge—and that of the world—for its own sake." But, he could not find supporters to help finance the expeditions without a goal that was more flashy. There was tremendous pressure on each man to be the first to reach the Pole, in order to gain financial support for continued expeditions.

Fraud trial 
In 1919, Cook started promoting startup oil companies in Fort Worth. In April 1923, Cook and 24 other Fort Worth oil promoters were indicted in a federal crackdown on fraudulent oil company promotions. Three of Cook's employees pleaded guilty, but Cook insisted on his innocence and went to trial. Also tried was his head advertising copywriter, S. E. J. Cox, who had been previously convicted of mail fraud in connection with his own oil company promotions.

Among other deceptive practices, Cook was charged with paying dividends from stock sales, rather than from profits. Cook's attorney was former politician Joseph Weldon Bailey, who clashed frequently with the judge. The jury found Cook guilty on 14 counts of fraud. In November 1923, Judge Killits sentenced Cook and 13 other oil company promoters to prison terms. Cook drew the longest sentence, 14 years 9 months. His attorney appealed the verdict, but the conviction was upheld.

Later life 
Cook was imprisoned until 1930. Roald Amundsen, who believed he owed his life to Cook's extrication of the Belgica, visited him several times. Cook was pardoned by President Franklin D. Roosevelt in 1940, ten years after his release and shortly before his death of a cerebral hemorrhage on August 5. He was interred at the Chapel of Forest Lawn Cemetery, Buffalo.

Popular culture 
 Cook & Peary: The Race to the Pole (1983) – American TV movie
 The Last Place on Earth (1985) – British miniseries
 The Navigator of New York (2003) – Novel by Wayne Johnston
 La jaula de los onas (2021) - Novel by Carlos Gamerro
 Madhouse at the End of the Earth: The Belgica’s Journey into the Dark Antarctic Night (2021) - by Julian Sancton
A Tree Grows in Brooklyn by Betty Smith Chapter 25 (1943)

Notes

References

External links 

 
 
 
 
 
 The Papers of Frederick Cook at Dartmouth College Library
 Winner Takes All: Dr. Cook and the Theft of the North Pole (1973) at Dartmouth College Library
 Samuel J. McCracken scrapbook on Cook's North Pole Claim at Dartmouth College Library

1865 births
1940 deaths
American explorers
American people of German descent
American polar explorers
American surgeons
Belgian Antarctic Expedition
Burials at Forest Lawn Cemetery (Buffalo)
Columbia University alumni
Discovery and invention controversies
Explorers of the Arctic
History of geography
New York University Grossman School of Medicine alumni